The Prodigal Son (Chinese: 敗家仔) is a 1981 Hong Kong martial arts comedy film starring Yuen Biao and directed by Sammo Hung, who also co-starred and wrote with Barry Wong. The film was released on 22 December 1981 and grossed HK$9,150,729. The Prodigal Son was nominated for two Hong Kong Film Awards and won the award for Best Action Choreography.

The film tells the story of Leung Chang, the son of a wealthy man who is half-heartedly studying kung fu. Leung Chang's lack of expertise forces his father to pay people to lose to him in fights. After Leung Chang discovers that his father has been deceiving him, he becomes inspired to study martial arts more seriously and attempts to convince a kung fu expert to take him on as a student.

Plot
Leung Chang is a young man in a wealthy family living in Foshan in the mid-19th century. He is a martial artist trained by two instructors in his father's employ. He has fought over three hundred times in Foshan and won every fight, but unbeknownst to him, his father has arranged for his servant Yee Tung-choi to bribe Chang's opponents to lose to him in order to protect him. This has caused Chang to believe that he is a world-class fighter, but in truth he hasn't even mastered the basics of kung fu and any real fighter could easily defeat him. Everyone knows this but him, giving him the nickname "The Prodigal Son" behind his back, because of the money he is costing his parents who pay to keep him from getting injured.

One night, three of Chang's friends attend a performance by the Lok Fung Lin Chinese Opera troupe. One of Chang's friends is attracted to the lead actress and asks her out on a date after the performance. She refuses, but he insists and even harasses her. She reveals herself to be a man, Leung Yee-tai, a master of Wing Chun. He beats up and humiliates Chang's friends. Chang challenges Yee-tai to a fight to avenge the insults to his friends. As usual, Yee Tung-choi tries to bribe Yee-tai to lose, but Yee-tai refuses, easily defeats Chang, and reveals the truth about his martial arts ineptitude to him.

Chang, desiring to learn real kung fu, asks Yee-tai to teach him Wing Chun. Yee-tai refuses because he thinks Chang would probably misuse it, but Chang has his father buy the Lok Fung Lin troupe and gives himself a job as Yee-tai's personal assistant, insisting on following Yee-tai everywhere until Yee-tai agrees to teach him Wing Chun. This continues for six months. The Lok Fung Lin troupe travels to Canton. There, Yee-tai's Wing Chun skills are witnessed by Lord Ngai Fei, the son of a Manchu duke, who is also a martial arts master and is hunting for a worthy opponent.

Ngai forces Yee-tai to fight him. Ngai and Yee-tai are evenly matched until Yee-tai has an asthma attack. Ngai stops the fight and postpones it until Yee-tai is healthy and fit for it. It is revealed that Ngai is also a "prodigal son"; unbeknownst to him, his father has ordered his bodyguards to protect him from anyone who might beat him in a fight. However, their methods are more ruthless and brutal than the bribery employed by Chang's parents; they resort to assassination.

During the night, Ngai's bodyguards and a team of assassins infiltrate the Lok Fung Lin theater, massacre the troupe, and burn down the theater. Yee-tai is having trouble sleeping because of his asthma, and he sees light reflected off an assassin's blade through his eyelids and reacts in time to escape along with Chang. The assassins think they died in the fire, as does everyone else. Yee-tai takes Chang to the home of his martial friend Wong Wah-bo. With Wah-bo's help, Chang finally convinces Yee-tai to teach him Wing Chun. Chang trains under both Yee-tai and Wah-bo; Yee-tai trains him in Wing Chun and Wah-bo trains him in freestyle fighting.

Over time, Chang achieves proficiency in martial arts, but Yee-tai's asthma is worsening. Chang takes Yee-tai back to Foshan to see a doctor. There, Ngai learns that Yee-tai is still alive, and he visits him. Yee-tai reveals that Ngai's bodyguards have been assassinating everyone who might beat Ngai. The bodyguards murder Yee-tai. Ngai, horrified, has his bodyguards executed. Chang challenges Ngai to a fight. Using everything that Yee-tai and Wah-bo taught him, he manages to beat Ngai.

Cast
Sammo Hung as Wong Wah-bo
Yuen Biao as Leung Chang, known as Leung Jan
Lam Ching-ying as Leung Yee-tai
Frankie Chan as Ngai Fei
Chan Lung as Yee Tung-choi
Chung Fat as Mr. Law
Dick Wei as Mr. Suen
Wai Pak as Au Ru Kwai
Chin Yuet-sang as Kung fu teacher
Hoi Sang Lee as Kung fu teacher
Wu Ma as Brick Man
James Tien as Broken right arm fighter
Cheung King-bo as Troupe manager
Ho Wai-han as Twiggy
Chan Yau-hau as Leung Chang's father
Lin Jin as Leung Chang's mother
Wang Hsieh as Duke
Ding Yue as Magistrate
Cheung Hei as Doctor

Production
In The Prodigal Son the depth and framing of the shots were a radical change from the two-dimensional approach to filming that had been used in Hong Kong at this point.

Release and reception
The Prodigal Son was released in Hong Kong on 22 December 1981. The film grossed a total of HK$9,150,729 at the Hong Kong box office. In the Philippines, the film was released by Season Films Universal on 11 January 1989. The Prodigal Son was released on DVD by Image Entertainment on 15 June 1999. It was later released again by 20th Century Fox in 2004 on DVD.

At the 2nd Hong Kong Film Awards, Sammo Hung, Lam Ching-ying, Yuen Biao and Billy Chan won the award for Best Action Choreography for their work in The Prodigal Son. The Prodigal Son was nominated for the Best Film and Best Director (Hung) awards, but lost both awards to Ann Hui's Boat People. In 2012, Time Out placed The Prodigal Son at number 54 on their list of Top 100 Hong Kong films.

See also
List of action films of the 1980s
List of Hong Kong films of 1981
Sammo Hung filmography
Yuen Biao filmography

Notes

External links

The Prodigal Son at Hong Kong Movie DataBase
The Prodigal Son at Hong Kong Cinemagic

1981 films
1981 martial arts films
1980s martial arts comedy films
Action films based on actual events
1980s Cantonese-language films
Films directed by Sammo Hung
Films set in Guangdong
Films set in Guangzhou
Films set in the 1850s
Films set in the 19th century
Golden Harvest films
Hong Kong films about revenge
Hong Kong martial arts comedy films
Hong Kong slapstick comedy films
Kung fu films
Films about Cantonese opera
1980s Hong Kong films